Jackie, Ethel, Joan: The Women of Camelot is a 2001 American drama miniseries directed by Larry Shaw and written by David Stevens. It is based on the 2000 book Jackie, Ethel, Joan: Women of Camelot by J. Randy Taraborrelli. The film stars Jill Hennessy, Lauren Holly, Leslie Stefanson, Daniel Hugh Kelly, Robert Knepper, Matt Letscher, Harve Presnell and Charmion King. The film premiered on NBC in two parts on March 4, 2001, and March 5, 2001.

Plot

Cast 
Jill Hennessy as Jackie Bouvier Kennedy
Lauren Holly as Ethel Skakel Kennedy
Leslie Stefanson as Joan Bennett Kennedy
Daniel Hugh Kelly as John F. Kennedy
Robert Knepper as Robert F. Kennedy
Matt Letscher as Ted Kennedy
Harve Presnell as Joseph P. Kennedy Sr.
Charmion King as Rose Kennedy
Wayne Best as George Smathers
Walker Boone as Steve Clark
Christopher Britton as Ted's Doctor 
Catherine Bruce as Sister Mary Leo
Adam Cabral as John F. Kennedy Jr.
Thom Christopher as Aristotle Onassis
William Colgate as Richard Nixon
Beau Dunker as Ted Kennedy Jr.
David Eisner as Schiff
Greg Ellwand as Peter Wilson
Madison Fitzpatrick as Caroline Kennedy
Richard Fitzpatrick as Frank Peters
Linda Goranson as Lady Bird Johnson
Paul Thomas Gordon as Peter Lawford
Kate Hemblen as Joan's Nanny
Shannon Hile as Elaine Mitchell
Tom Howard as Lyndon B. Johnson
Jeno Huber as Prince Stanisław Albrecht Radziwiłł
Jamie Johnston as Young Patrick Kennedy
Geoff Kahnert as Sargent Shriver
Ray Kahnert Bobby's Priest
Tamsin Kelsey as Eunice Kennedy Shriver
Anne L'Espérance as Cathy
Sarah Lafleur as Marilyn Monroe
Shawn Lawrence as Alex Carter
Gene Mack as Rosey Grier
Louisa Martin as Maude Shaw
Kaya McGregor as Pat Kennedy
Nicole Michaux as Jean Ann Smith
Julia Pagel as Kathleen Kennedy
Rosemary Pate as Kara
Karl Pruner as Clinton Hill
Matt Sadowski as Joseph P. Kennedy II
Jeffrey Smith as Jim Ketchum
Joy Tanner as Lee Bouvier
Bruce Vavrina as Roger Mudd
Jonathan Whittaker as Lem Billings
Brad Wietersen as Stephen Edward Smith

References

External links
 

2001 television films
2001 films
2000s American television miniseries
2001 drama films
NBC network original films
Films about the Kennedy family
Cultural depictions of Jacqueline Kennedy Onassis
Cultural depictions of John F. Kennedy
Cultural depictions of Robert F. Kennedy
Cultural depictions of Aristotle Onassis
Cultural depictions of Lyndon B. Johnson
Cultural depictions of Richard Nixon
Cultural depictions of Marilyn Monroe
American drama television films
2000s English-language films
Films directed by Larry Shaw
2000s American films